The Maharashtra Arthik Vikas Mahamandal (MAVIM) is a government agency dedicated to women's development throughout the Indian state of Maharashtra.

Programs 
Since its founding in 1975, MAVIM has offered various empowerment programs. MAVIM specifically aimed to empower marginalized women, rural and urban, into self-help groups, where they achieve social, economic and political empowerment. MAVIM acts as the medium between self-help groups, financial institutions and government agencies. MAVIM’s guiding philosophy is to empower women as a means to women’s development. It works to ensure delivery of the government guidelines for nutrition of pregnant women and children.

Published works 

 Supervision report :Tejaswini: Maharashtra Rural Women’s Empowerment Programme by IFAD
 A Study of Quality and Sustainability SHGs Promoted By Government Organizations by International Journal of Engineering Technology Science and Research IJETSR

Awards 

 2015 Gender Award for Tejaswini Maharashtra Rural Women Empowerment Program , India

References

Government schemes in Maharashtra